San Cristóbal is a town and municipality located in the Bolívar Department, northern Colombia. It is located on the south shore of the Dique Canal.

References

Municipalities of Bolívar Department